Cognitive capture has alternative meanings in the social sciences. It is a type of:

 Inattentional blindness in the field of psychology.
 Regulatory capture in the field of economics.